New Atlantis is a novel by Sir Francis Bacon.

New Atlantis may also refer to:
 The New Atlantis (journal), a journal founded in 2003
 New Atlantis (micronation), a micronation founded by Leicester Hemingway on a raft off Jamaica in the 1960s
 New Atlantis, a fictional country in Anatole France's Penguin Island
 "The New Atlantis", a short story by Ursula K. Le Guin

See also
Atlantis (disambiguation)
The New Atalantis, 1709 political satire by Delarivier Manley